Wayne Mosdell (born December 4, 1944) is a Canadian former professional ice hockey player who played in the World Hockey Association (WHA). Mosdell played part of the 1972–73 WHA season with the Philadelphia Blazers.

References

External links

1944 births
Canadian ice hockey defencemen
Hampton Gulls (SHL) players
Living people
Memphis South Stars players
Philadelphia Blazers players
Roanoke Valley Rebels (EHL) players
Roanoke Valley Rebels (SHL) players
Rochester Americans players
Salem Rebels (EHL) players
Ice hockey people from Montreal
Springfield Indians players
Toronto Marlboros players
Toronto St. Michael's Majors players
Vancouver Canucks (WHL) players